Fred Leonard Perrett (9 May 1891 – 1 December 1918) was a Welsh international rugby union prop who played club rugby for Neath. He won five caps for Wales, and in his first international game faced the touring South Africans.

Rugby career
Perrett originally played rugby for his local club Briton Ferry before eventually playing for Neath. While a member of Neath he earned his first Welsh cap against the touring South Africa team. Wales ran the South Africans close, but lost to a single penalty kick.

Perrett was reselected for Wales in the 1913 Five Nations Championship, one of only two Welsh players to appear in all four matches of the campaign; the other being Neath teammate Glyn Stephens. The two complemented each other well, especially during line outs. The Welsh team lost the first game against England, but won the final three games to finish second. Perrett may have been selected for further Wales matches, but turned professional at the end of the 1912/13 season, joining rugby league team Leeds, making his début on 6 September 1913, he later joined Hull F.C.

Perrett's league career was cut short by the outbreak of World War I. He joined the Welsh Guards, and served in France from 19 February 1916. He was subsequently commissioned as a second lieutenant, and transferred to the 17th Battalion of the Royal Welsh Fusiliers with seniority from 27 June 1917. He was seriously injured and died of his wounds in a casualty clearing station almost a month after the Armistice. He is buried at Terlincthun British Cemetery at Wimille in France. Perrett is often left out of lists of the Welsh international war dead due to his supposed defection to the professional game.

International matches played
Wales
  1913
  1913
  1913
  1913
  1912

Bibliography

References

External links
Neath RFC Remembers - First World War
Neath Rugby Remembers

1891 births
1918 deaths
Aberavon RFC players
British Army personnel of World War I
British military personnel killed in World War I
Hull F.C. players
Leeds Rhinos players
Neath RFC players
Royal Welch Fusiliers officers
Rugby league players from Briton Ferry
Rugby union players from Briton Ferry
Rugby union props
Wales international rugby union players
Welsh Guards soldiers
Welsh rugby league players
Welsh rugby union players